"When We Were Young" is the second single by Australian dance band Sneaky Sound System, taken from their second studio album 2. It was released on 15 November 2008 on Whack Records as a CD single and digital download. The song was written by band members Angus McDonald (aka Black Angus) and Connie Mitchell.

Background
Sneaky Sound System's second album, 2 was released by Whack Records on 16 August 2008 and produced by band members Black Angus (aka Angus McDonald) and Donnie Sloan; it was mixed by 'Spike' Stent and Paul PDub Walton (Madonna, Björk, Massive Attack, Gwen Stefani) at Olympic Studios in London. The first single to be released from the album, "Kansas City" was released on 12 July, which peaked at #14 on the Australian ARIA Singles Chart, becoming their second biggest hit after "UFO". "When We Were Young" was the second single from the album, it was released on 15 November. The song did not show as much success as "Kansas City" and was their second single not to enter the top 100 after "Tease Me" but it did chart at #16 on the dance chart and #7 on the independent chart, the remix also charted at #9 in the club chart. "16", the third single, was released on 14 February 2009. "It's Not My Problem" was the fourth single from the album, which peaked at #8 on the Australian Club Chart, and #79 on the Australian Airplay Chart.

Track listing

Charts

(1) indicates that The Goodwill/Breakbot/Gloves mix charted.

Release history

References

External links
"When We Were Young" CD single on Waterfront Records

Sneaky Sound System songs
2008 singles
Songs written by Connie Mitchell
2008 songs